Sajda Tere Pyar Mein is an Indian television soap opera which made its debut in 2012 and ended in 2012. The story was about Aliyaa, a college student, finds purpose and reason in life through love. Her patriotism is put to the test as she takes on terrorists. It was axed by the channel due to low viewership ratings.

Plot
Sajda Tere Pyar Mein follows the journey of 21-year-old Aliyaa. She is a modern Muslim student based in Mumbai, where she transforms from a happy-go-lucky girl into a mature young woman. Aliyaa's love interest, Ranveer, is an ATB (Anti-Terrorism Bureau) agent, working for India's external intelligence agency. Ranveer asks Aliyaa for help in catching the underworld Don Mahendra Pratap. She comes to a crossroad where she is forced to choose between love and duty.

The story opens in Mumbai. Aliyaa lives with her elder sister with her husband and daayi jaa. Aliyaa is the sister of Nafisa a police officer who handles family and duty while her husband Rahib is an office worker. Aliyaa has three friends: Nargis who is very close to her (even when Aliyaa is leaving her home she tells the secret of her mission to Nargis), Rishi a drug-addicted boy who eventually falls in love with Aliyaa but Aliyaa tries to help him as her friend and tells him that she doesn't love him. She is persuaded by ATB agent Ranveer who is keeping secrets about his past his family thinks that he is the responsible for his father's death. Later he saw Aliyaa who looks like julia who is wife of mahendra pratap he had been kept his eyes on her from a long time Aliyaa always looks at him but one night she confronts by him and he recruits her to help him to arrest mahendra pratap after a long confrontation she agrees and goes to mahendra pratap as mehreen whereas mahendra pratap a broken hearted lover who lost his love julia long time ago mahendra tries to go close to her as plan works both meets and the mission starts, m.p an aggressive ruthless don who blasts in Mumbai for his lust and money later he traps in the plan of ranveer and confronts aaliyah he tries to shoot her but leaves her as he realises that he can't kill his love and surrenders, ranveer and Aaliya goes to aaliyah's home and they faced nafisa and her family and soon everyone realised and prouds on Aaliya, ranveer proposed to her family to marry her where aaliyah's family agrees and the story ends.

Cast

References

External links
 Sajda Tere Pyar Mein (Official website) on Star Plus
 

Rakesh Kumar

Indian television series
2012 Indian television series debuts
StarPlus original programming
2012 Indian television series endings
Television shows set in Mumbai